Craig Mathieson (born 1971) is an Australian music journalist and writer. His books include, Hi Fi Days (1996), The Sell-In in (2000) and the 100 Best Australian Albums in 2010, with Toby Creswell and John O'Donnell

Biography
Craig Mathieson was born in 1971 and grew up in rural Victoria. At the age of 18, he started writing professionally about rock & roll, contributing to daily newspapers and rock magazines both in Australia and overseas. He became the editor of Juice, one of Australia's leading pop culture magazines, at 23.

Hi Fi Days (1996) is a biography of three leading Australian bands, Silverchair, Spiderbait and You Am I. The Sell-In (2000) documents the rise of the Australia's alternative music scene and how that success attracted the interest of the music industry's major labels.

As from October 2010, Mathieson works freelance for a number of publications, including the magazine Rolling Stone, The Bulletin, GQ, HQ and national newspapers The Age, and The Sydney Morning Herald.

Since March 2012 Mathieson has been the film critic for the Sunday Age.

Bibliography

Books

Essays and reporting

References

Australian journalists
Australian music journalists
1971 births
Living people
Australian magazine editors
Rolling Stone people